George Thomas Simon (May 9, 1912 – February 13, 2001) was an American jazz writer and occasional drummer. He began as a drummer and performed in this role in early versions of Glenn Miller's orchestra. He wrote about that orchestra in 1974 with Glenn Miller and His Orchestra, known for being the most comprehensive writing on Glenn Miller and his big band.

Life and work
Simon was born and died in New York City, New York. Simon was born into a wealthy and talented family. Not only was his father wealthy, but his brother, Richard L. Simon, was the co-founder of the American publishing house Simon & Schuster, and singer-songwriter Carly Simon is one of his nieces. He graduated with a Bachelor of Arts degree from Harvard College in 1934, and began working for  Metronome magazine the following year. He was editor-in-chief of Metronome from 1939 to 1955
and shifted its emphasis from a publisher of technical articles to a chronicler of the swing era. Simon was probably the most influential jazz commentator during the swing era. Thanks to his inside connections with the jazz world, he was able to report information about bands and their personnel with great accuracy. After leaving Metronome, he was involved with the Jazztone Society (1956–57), was a consultant to the Timex All-Star Jazz Show broadcast from 1957 to 1959, and wrote about jazz for the New York Herald Tribune and the New York Post daily newspapers. He also composed liner notes for musicians including Thelonious Monk. In 1978, he won a Grammy Award for Best Album Notes.

Simon died of pneumonia in 2001 at the age of 88, after years of suffering from Parkinson's disease. He was inducted into the Big Band and Jazz Hall of Fame the following year (2002).

Selected bibliography

The Feeling of Jazz, 1961
The Sinatra Report, 1965
The Big Bands, 1968
Simon Says: The Sights and Sounds of the Big Band Era, 1971
Glenn Miller and His Orchestra, 1974
The Big Bands Songbook, 1975
The Best of the Music Makers, 1979

References

External links
Scott Yanow, Allmusic
Jazz House
Christopher Popa, "Critics, Journalists and Other Writers: George T. Simon".
George T. Simon Interview NAMM Oral History Library (1994)
Pop Chronicles Interviews #160 - George T. Simon, October 26, 1971.

1912 births
2001 deaths
American jazz drummers
American people of German-Jewish descent
Jewish American musicians
Harvard College alumni
Grammy Award winners
Writers from New York City
20th-century American biographers
20th-century American drummers
American male drummers
Carly Simon
Jazz musicians from New York (state)
American male jazz musicians
Simon family (publishing)
20th-century American male musicians